Ciosny may refer to the following places:
Ciosny, Tomaszów Mazowiecki County in Łódź Voivodeship (central Poland)
Ciosny, Zgierz County in Łódź Voivodeship (central Poland)
Ciosny, Masovian Voivodeship (east-central Poland)